Alderwood Collegiate Institute (Alderwood CI, ACI, or Alderwood), named Alderwood Secondary School and Alderwood High School prior is a former public high school that existed from 1955 to 1983 under the governance of the Etobicoke Board of Education (now part of the Toronto District School Board) and that served the Alderwood neighbourhood in the former city of Etobicoke in Toronto, Ontario, Canada.

The school merged with New Toronto Secondary School to form Lakeshore Collegiate Institute in 1983. The portion of the Alderwood property was transferred to the TDSB's realtor arm, Toronto Lands Corporation (TLC) in 2011 and sold to Urbancorp, a housing developer in August 2012.

History

Origins
In 1952, the Etobicoke Board of Education had originally intended a middle school in the present site. With overcrowding at Royal York Collegiate Institute, the board decided to purchase the 15.87-acre Shields Site for $148,000. The northern portion would be then used for Douglas Park Junior School which opened in 1956.

Gordon S. Adamson and Associates were commissioned as architects for the Alderwood project. Construction began on July 30, 1954, but the flooding from Hurricane Hazel caused a delay. The school was opened on September 6, 1955, to the first 340 students, with the official opening ceremony November 1955. With increasing population, four classrooms, a science lab, a commercial room, a new auditorium and enlarged cafeteria were added in 1960.

Closure and onwards
In September 1980, New Toronto Secondary School, Royal York Collegiate Institute (now Etobicoke School of the Arts), and Alderwood underwent a review due to low enrollment as many catholic immigrants who arrived in the area transferred their children to the separate school system when full separate school funding commenced.  As a consequence, on June 24, 1981, the Etobicoke Board approved the closure of Alderwood and New Toronto whose students were combined into the newly renamed Lakeshore Collegiate Institute on June 25, 1983, with the afternoon closing ceremonies.

Since the merger of Etobicoke's first catholic high school, Michael Power/St. Joseph High School in 1982, the main campus suffered overcrowding resulting in the Alderwood building being leased to the Metropolitan Separate School Board (later the Toronto Catholic District School Board) from the Etobicoke Board of Education. It was reopened as the south campus of Michael Power/St. Joseph. In September 1986, Father John Redmond Catholic Secondary School was established. The school later moved to a new building in New Toronto's large former Mimico Lunatic Asylum grounds in 2006 after its buildings were deteriorated.

Val Homes
Alderwood Collegiate's buildings remained empty for five years. In 2011, however, the TDSB transferred the vacant Alderwood's 8.5-acre portion of the original 14.1-acre site to the Toronto Lands Corporation (TLC) for sale.  TLC sold the portion to a townhouse developer, Urbancorp in August 2012. After much community consultations, Alderwood's school facilities were demolished in November 2014 with the property being converted to a residential complex known as Val Homes. Subsequently, Urbancorp filed for the Companies Creditors Arrangement Act. Couple years after, Mattamy Homes took over the 92-unit residential project with a combined of detached and semi-detached.

See also
List of high schools in Ontario

Notable alumni
Gary Edwards – former NHL player
Morris Titanic – former NHL player
Dave Hynek – former NHL player
Gary Inness – former NHL player
Kenneth Raymond Hodge – former NHL player
Brian McCutcheon – former NHL player
Bruce Driver – former NHL player
Gord Judges – former CFL player 
Andrew McConnell – former NFL/CFL player
Bob Russell – former WHA player
Ric Jordan – former WHA player
Dave Westner – former CHL player
Robbie Patten – former NLL player
Paul Suggate – former NLL player
Bill Coghill – former NLL player
Dominic (Mickey) Ianezzi – former NLL player
Wayne Granger – former NLL player
Pat Kelly – former NLL player
Dave Roach – former NLL player
Bob Smith – former NLL player
Milton MacNeil – former NLL player
Ken Venning – pro golfer
Earl MacNeil – former NLA player
Ron MacNeil – former NLA/ELA player
Mickey Cherevaty – former OHA, CPHL, & IHL player
Glen Siddall – former OHA (Jr & Sr) & IHL player
Bob Wright – former SHL & IHL player
Steve Repic – QB for Canadian National CIS Champion
Bill McIntyre – WR for St. Francis Xavier University. Set his university's record for receptions and yards
Ken Tyler – former Olympic ice hockey coach 
Trudy Young - actress
Ian Wadell - politician, author and filmmaker	
Robert Herjavec - entrepreneur, author and celebrity
Frank Wescott - poet, lyricist and musician
Cheryl Wagner - Gemini Award and Emmy award- winning Canadian children's television writer, showrunner and producer
Bohdan Klymkiw - writer
Gayle Olinek(ova) - athlete, writer of books on exercise and healthy lifestyles	
John R. Bell - writer	
Carole Taylor - politician, broadcast journalist	
Doris (Tyler) Bradstreet Daughney - QUEEN'S GOLDEN JUBILEE MEDAL RECIPIENT for BC Community service and business leadership
Dr. Norman Okihiro - professor, researcher, author	
Dr. Mervin Kril - Neurosurgeon	
Gregory Wowchuk - Engineer on Professional Engineers of Ontario Council
Arch Haslett - writer−	
Paul Jeffries - Legal Counsel at The Law Society of Upper Canada−	
Dr. Jim Frankish - Professor, UBC Faculty Community Service Award−	
Dr. Richard Andreychuk - Psychiatrist−	
Blaine Allan - Professor, Author−	
Brian Bradstreet -  founding partner of Hamblin Watsa Investment Counsel Ltd.
Ross Munro - music lawyer, manager, & owner of Rock his Way chain of music schools in the GTA
Barry Webster - writer
Dr. Frances Flint - Ph.D. 1991 in sport psychology and sports medicine
Dr. Judy Oleniuk - North York General Hospital Adult Mental Health Program Supervisor
Chris Shephard - musician in BTS - launched the Juno Award-winning dance group
Claude Kent - member of the Fits - 'Bored of Education' would become perhaps the finest punk song ever to come out of Canada.
Bob Ewing - Created a garden in 2014 designed to attract butterflies to Rotary Peace Park in Tidehead, NB. and to be a quiet, beautiful spot for people to stroll through.
Brenda Heron Clarence - earned commendation from Halton Regional Police for volunteer of the year in community policing.

References

External links
 Alderwood Collegiate Institute
 Alderwood Collegiate Institute ALUMNI Facebook

Schools in the TDSB
High schools in Toronto
Education in Etobicoke
Educational institutions established in 1955
Educational institutions disestablished in 1983
1955 establishments in Ontario
1983 disestablishments in Ontario
Toronto Lands Corporation
Defunct schools in Canada
Demolished buildings and structures in Ontario
Buildings and structures demolished in 2014